July 25 - Eastern Orthodox Church calendar - July 27

All fixed commemorations below are celebrated on August 8 by Old Calendar.

For July 26th, Orthodox Churches on the Old Calendar commemorate the Saints listed on July 13.

Saints
 Nun-martyr Paraskevi of Rome (138-161)
 Martyr Oraiozela of Byzantium, near the Bosphorus, under Domitian (c. 81-96)
 Virgin-martyr Jerusalem of Byzantium, friend of St. Oraiozela, near the Bosphorus (c. 81-96)
 Hieromartyrs Hermolaus, Hermippus and Hermocrates at Nicomedia (c. 305)
 Martyr Appion, by the sword.
 Venerable Moses the Hungarian, of the Kiev Caves Monastery (c. 1043)
 Venerable Ignatius of Mt. Stirion, monk.
 Venerable Symeon the Archimandrite and Stylite.

Pre-Schism Western saints
 Saint Pastor, a priest in Rome and by tradition the brother of Pope Pius I (c. 160) 
 Saints Symphronius, Olympius, Theodulus and Exuperia, all burnt to death under Valerian (257) 
 Saint Valens (Valente), Bishop of Verona in Italy from 524 to 531 (531) 
 Saint Simeon of Padolirone (Simeon of Mantua), an Armenian hermit who went on pilgrimage to Jerusalem, Rome, Compostella and Tours (1016)

Post-Schism Orthodox saints
 Venerable Gerontius, founder of St. Anne’s Skete, Mount Athos (13th century)
 Saint Sava III, Archbishop of Serbia (1316)
 Saint Ioannicius the New, Schemamonk of Muscel, Romania (1638)
 Venerable Iakov Netsvetov of Atka Island and Ikogmute, missionary priest to the Yup’ik on the Yukon River, Enlightener of Alaska (1864)
 Saint Isaac, Hieromonk of Svyatogorsk Monastery (1903)
 Saint Theodosius of the Caucasus, Schema-Igumen (Hieroconfessor Theodosius Of Minvody) (1948)

New martyrs and confessors
 New Hieromartyr Sergius Strelnikov, Priest (1937)

Other commemorations
 Icon of the Most Holy Theotokos "Of Emvolon" (in Pegadion by the New Colonnade), Constantinople.
 Consecration of the Temple the Holy Archangel Michael in Scallae.
 Consecration of the Temple the Holy Archangel Gabriel in Chaldae.
 Repose of Elder Theophanes of Solovki Monastery (1819)
 Repose of Archimandrite Nathaniel (Pospelov) of Pskov-Caves Monastery (2002)

Icon gallery

Notes

References

Sources
 July 26/August 8. Orthodox Calendar (PRAVOSLAVIE.RU).
 August 8 / July 26. HOLY TRINITY RUSSIAN ORTHODOX CHURCH (A parish of the Patriarchate of Moscow).
 July 26. OCA - The Lives of the Saints.
 July 25. The Year of Our Salvation - Holy Transfiguration Monastery, Brookline, Massachusetts. 
 The Autonomous Orthodox Metropolia of Western Europe and the Americas (ROCOR). St. Hilarion Calendar of Saints for the year of our Lord 2004. St. Hilarion Press (Austin, TX). p. 55.
 The Twenty-Sixth Day of the Month of July. Orthodoxy in China.
 July 26. Latin Saints of the Orthodox Patriarchate of Rome.
 The Roman Martyrology. Transl. by the Archbishop of Baltimore. Last Edition, According to the Copy Printed at Rome in 1914. Revised Edition, with the Imprimatur of His Eminence Cardinal Gibbons. Baltimore: John Murphy Company, 1916. p. 221.
 Rev. Richard Stanton. A Menology of England and Wales, or, Brief Memorials of the Ancient British and English Saints Arranged According to the Calendar, Together with the Martyrs of the 16th and 17th Centuries. London: Burns & Oates, 1892. pp. 358–362.

 Greek Sources
 Great Synaxaristes:  26 ΙΟΥΛΙΟΥ. ΜΕΓΑΣ ΣΥΝΑΞΑΡΙΣΤΗΣ.
  Συναξαριστής. 26 Ιουλίου. ECCLESIA.GR. (H ΕΚΚΛΗΣΙΑ ΤΗΣ ΕΛΛΑΔΟΣ). 
  26/07/. Ορθόδοξος Συναξαριστής.

 Russian Sources
  8 августа (26 июля). Православная Энциклопедия под редакцией Патриарха Московского и всея Руси Кирилла (электронная версия). (Orthodox Encyclopedia - Pravenc.ru).
  26 июля по старому стилю / 8 августа по новому стилю. СПЖ "Союз православных журналистов". .
  26 июля (ст.ст.) 8 августа  (нов. ст.). Русская Православная Церковь Отдел внешних церковных связей. (DECR).

July in the Eastern Orthodox calendar